Teniorhinus ignita, the fiery small fox , is a butterfly in the family Hesperiidae. It is found in Sierra Leone, Liberia, Ivory Coast, Ghana, Nigeria, Cameroon, Gabon, the Republic of the Congo, the Central African Republic, the Democratic Republic of the Congo, western Uganda, western Tanzania and northern Zambia. The habitat consists of forests and woodland.

References

Butterflies described in 1877
Erionotini
Butterflies of Africa
Taxa named by Paul Mabille